Kubo (written:  or ) is a Japanese surname. Notable people with the surname include:

Asaka Kubo (born 1979), lead singer of the musical group A+Jyuc
, Japanese ice hockey player
Junko Kubo (born 1972), Japanese television announcer
Märt Kubo (born 1944), Estonian theatre pedagogue, critic and politician
, Japanese sport shooter
, Japanese writer
, Japanese fencer
Ryogo Kubo (1920–1995), Japanese mathematical physicist
, Japanese footballer
Shinji Kubo, a fictional character from The Sound of Waves
Shogo Kubo (1959–2014), member of a group of skateboarders called Z-Boys
Tatsuhiko Kubo (born 1976), Japanese soccer player
, Japanese footballer
Takuro Kubo (born 1971), member of the Japanese rock band GLAY
Tite Kubo (born 1977), Japanese manga artist
, Japanese handball player
Toshiaki Kubo (born 1975), Japanese shogi player
, Japanese footballer
Wataru Kubo (1929–2003), Japanese politician
Yurika Kubo (born 1989), Japanese voice actress and singer
Yuya Kubo (born 1993), Japanese footballer

Japanese-language surnames